Pseudancistrus reus is a species of catfish in the family Loricariidae. It is native to South America, where it occurs in the Caroní River in Venezuela. It is typically found in presumably blackwater environments (described as "tea-colored") with low conductivity and a moderate current. The species reaches 7.7 cm (3 inches) SL. Its specific epithet, reus, is derived from Latin and translates to "prisoner", alluding to the species' barred patterning which resembles a stereotypical prison uniform.

References 

Fish described in 2008
reus